The Mōkau River is located in the North Island of New Zealand.

The river rises as a spring in the Pureora Forest, south of Te Kuiti, on the slopes of the Rangitoto Range. After briefly following a north-westward course, it turns south-westwards and flows for  through the Waitomo District of the King Country. It enters the North Taranaki Bight at its mouth at the town of Mōkau.

In the late 19th century and early 20th century, the banks of the river were host to a thriving industry of logging and coal-mining. However, the risks and costs of transporting goods down the Mōkau eventually ended such enterprise.

Today the river is a popular whitebaiting and kayaking location.

See also 
Wairere Power Station

References

 "Mokau River", An Encyclopaedia of New Zealand, edited by A. H. McLintock, 1966
 SS Mokau, Mōkau River, 1908

Further reading

External links
 Puke Ariki - Shooting Up The Mokau River  
 Puke Ariki - Mokau River Holds Stories of Past
 Wairere Falls on 1:50,000 map
 Wairere Falls in 1908 - photo in Auckland Weekly News 30 JANUARY 1908 p13 (AWNS-19080130-13-1)
 2014 upgrade of Wairere Falls power station and cross section
 Plan for additional power station shelved in 2011
Auckland Weekly News photo of 1927 opening of Mokau Bridge

Rivers of Waikato
Waitomo District
Rivers of New Zealand